NGC 4607 is an edge-on spiral galaxy located about 56 million light-years away in the constellation Virgo. NGC 4607 was discovered by astronomer R. J. Mitchell  on April 24, 1854. The galaxy is a member of the Virgo Cluster.

Interaction with NGC 4606
NGC 4607 may be a possible companion of NGC 4606 and they are separated from each other by a projected distance of about ~. Despite this, NGC 4607 does not show any evidence in the optical or H I of having been tidally disturbed unlike NGC 4606. This would be inconsistent if a strong tidal interaction has occurred between the two galaxies. Also, both galaxies' redshifts differ by about 600 km/s making it unlikely that they are a gravitationally bound pair.

See also
 List of NGC objects (4001–5000)
 NGC 4302 - Another galaxy in the Virgo Cluster with a similar appearance

References

External links

Virgo (constellation)
Spiral galaxies
4607
42544
7843
Astronomical objects discovered in 1854
Virgo Cluster